Anaya Kunst is a Brazilian composer, musician, recording artist, filmmaker, author, and music producer.  Her genre has been described as New Age,  Instrumental, and Electronic and she has won numerous awards including Global Music Awards, Clouzine International Music Awards, and was nominated for an Independent Music Award and Hollywood Music in Media Award, among others. As a music video and short film producer and director, she won Best Original Music, Best Director, and Best Women Filmmaker for Dragons Gate at the Critics Choice International Film Festival as well as receiving awards by Beyond the Curve International Film Festival (Paris, France), the Los Angeles Motion Picture Festival, the Swedish International Film Festival, and others.

Early life and education 
Anaya Kunst was born Tania Mara Botelho in São Paulo, Brazil and learned to play the piano at 9 years old and guitar at 15 years old as well as studying ballet and gymnastics.  She is a trained opera singer and studied at Conservatorio with Carlos Gomez. She holds a master's degree from the Federal University of Rio de Janeiro, a doctorate degree from Loughborough University of Technology in England, and a post doctorate degree from Syracuse University School of Information Studies.

Career
Anaya Kunst composes, performs, produces, and directs under the name Anaya Kunst and Anaya Music. She plays the piano, guitar, flute, and saxophone and has won numerous  music awards as well as international film awards for film shorts and music videos.

Kunst has won numerous awards for her work in music and film including the Critics Choice International Film Festival Awards where she won Best Original Music, Best Director, and Best Women Filmmaker for Dragons Gate  and won Best Female New Age Artist at the Indie Music Channel Awards. In 2020, she was nominated for a Peace Song Award for her spoken word song, Let Peace Be (co-written with Cindy Paulos).

She has released 11 full-length studio albums which have received favorable reviews. Her music combines elements of instruments, technology, and electronic music and is recorded at 432 HZ, a frequency that some believe aligns with the heart chakra to bring quiet and calm. Anaya music is featured on the Sounds From The Circle VI compilation album by Suzanne Doucet.

In 2018, Kunst's album, AONKI - Gateway of Love, was recorded and performed virtually in Prague with musicians from the Czech Philharmonic. She has worked with Gonzaguinha and Ivan Lins, whom she has performed with at several events.

Discography
 2011 - Cosmic Light
 2013 - Skywalker in the Universe
 2013 - Aligned in the Universe
 2014 - Devotion
 2015 - Fifth Essence 
 2016 - Eternity
 2018 - Aonki - Gateway of Love
 2019 - Isalc"Li: A Love Odyssey
 2020 - Beyond Earth
 2021 - Rising Sun
 2022 - Self Music
 2022 - Ascension

Music Awards
 2017 - Global Music Award - Silver Medal for Outstanding Achievement New Age - Love's River
 2017 - Global Music Award - Best Composer Award - Dharma
 2018 - Independent Music Awards (IMAs) - Nominated Best Album - Eternity   	
 2018 - Clouzine International Music Awards - Best New Age Album - Aonki: A Gateway of Lover  
 2019 - Clouzine International Music Award - Best New Age Album - Aligned in the Universe   
 2019 - Clouzine International Electronic Music Award - Best Album - 4D Eternity    
 2019 - Indie Music Channel Award - Best Female New Age Artist      
 2020 - Hollywood Music in Media Awards Nominated Best New Age/Ambient - Breath   
 2020 - Global Song Peace Awards - Best Spoken Word - Let Peace Be (written by Anaya Music and Cindy Paulos)

Film Shorts and Music Video Awards
 2022 - Critics Choice International Film Festival - Best Original Music, Best Director, and Best Women Filmmaker for Dragons Gate
 2020 - New Wave Film Festival (Munich, Germany) - Best Song - Dreams   
 2020 - Royal Wolf Film Awards - Best Original Music Score - Immortal
 2021 - New Wave Film Festival (Munich, Germany) - Best Song Award - Dreams
 2021 - Beyond the Curve International Film Festival (Paris, France) - Best Original Music - Love   
 2021 - Los Angeles Motion Picture Festival - Best Music Video and Best Music Track - Ascension To Love'''
 2021 - Swedish International Film Festival - Best Original Music - Timing 2021 - Red Movie Awards - Best Production Design - Immortal 2021 - Accolade Global Film Competition Award (USA)- Best Original Song - Breath''

References

Living people
Women in electronic music
New-age musicians
Brazilian composers
Brazilian filmmakers
Year of birth missing (living people)